Valore, Inc. is an American company that provides an online textbook marketplace, ValoreBooks.

History
Valore, Inc. (formerly SimpleTuition, Inc.), is the Boston-based parent company of ValoreBooks, an online textbook marketplace. The company was founded in 2005 with the launch of its first product, SimpleTuition, an online student loan comparison engine. The SimpleTuition product is now operated by LendingTree. The company has launched a number of additional products including a rewards program. SmarterBucks was sold to Gradifi in 2015.

In 2012, to address the high cost of textbooks, the company acquired ValoreBooks — an online marketplace whose tagline claims that it saves students up to 90% on the cost of textbooks. In 2015, the company acquired Boundless, which offers affordable digital textbook replacements using openly licensed content.

Valore was venture-backed, and investors included Atlas Venture, Flybridge Capital Partners and North Hill Ventures. Valore was acquired by Follett in 2016.

References 

Online marketplaces of the United States
Education finance in the United States